U-7 may refer to one of the following submarines:

Germany
 , was a Type U 5 submarine launched in 1910 and served in the First World War until sunk on 21 January 1915
 During the First World War, Germany also had these submarines with similar names:
 , a Type UB I submarine launched in 1915 and sunk on 27 September 1916
 , a Type UC I submarine launched in 1915 and grounded on 5 July 1916
 , a Type IIB submarine that served in the Second World War and stricken on 18 February 1944
 , a Type 205 submarine of the Bundesmarine that was launched in 1964 and sold in 1965

Austria-Hungary
  was the designation applied to two submarines:
 , ordered as U-7, the lead boat for the Austro-Hungarian Navy U-7 class; sold to Germany before her 1915 launch; became lead boat of German Type U 66 submarine; disappeared September 1917
 , a German Type UB I submarine that operated in the Mediterranean; co-flagged as the Austro-Hungarian U-boat SM U-7; disappeared September 1916

Submarines of Germany